The golden monkey (Cercopithecus kandti) is a species of Old World monkey found in the Virunga volcanic mountains of Central Africa, including four national parks: Mgahinga, in south-west Uganda; Volcanoes, in north-west Rwanda; and Virunga and Kahuzi-Biéga, in the eastern Democratic Republic of Congo. It is restricted to highland forest, especially near bamboo.

This species was previously thought to be a subspecies of the blue monkey (Cercopithecus mitis), and the two are similar overall, but the golden monkey has a golden-orange patch on the upper flanks and back.

Not much is known about the golden monkey's behaviour. It lives in social groups of up to 30 individuals. Its diet consists mainly of bamboo, leaves and fruit, though it is also thought to eat insects.

Due to the gradual destruction of their habitat and recent wars in their limited habitat, the golden monkey is listed as endangered on the IUCN Red List.

Distribution and habitat
Due to its diet the golden monkey prefers a habitat with abundant fruit and bamboo. The golden monkey moves in between areas depending on the season. During the season where ripe fruit is available they remain in those areas. With the beginning of the rainy season, bamboo is shooting and the golden monkeys move to such habitats. Results of studies indicate that if there is an area consisting of mixed fruit and bamboo, the golden monkeys tend to frequent that area more than areas consisting of only bamboo. Authors of one study reported that golden monkeys are most frequently seen in bamboo forests, suggesting that the species prefers this habitat. The Virunga volcanic mountains have contrasting areas that have different food densities, in which the golden monkeys are capable of adjusting their diets to. In the Virunga massif, the golden monkeys have folivorous diets, containing bamboo shoots. However, in the Gishwati forest, the golden monkeys have a frugivorous diet, consuming mostly fruits and shrubs.

Behavior and ecology
The golden monkey can travel in various group sizes, and have been seen in small groups of three up to large groups of 62 monkeys. The groups that are found at higher elevations tend to be smaller. The golden monkey will often return to one of several different sleeping areas after a day of feeding. The monkeys often sleep in small subgroups of four, at the top of bamboo plants. They will often use a dense bamboo plant, or a combination of several bamboo plants that weave together to make a sufficient foundation for sleep. The golden monkey will often feed near the sleeping area and return to this same sleeping location day after day.

Diet
The golden monkey has a diet that consists primarily of young bamboo leaves, fruits, bamboo branchlets, bamboo shoots, invertebrates, flowers, and shrubs. However, the golden monkey is an opportunistic feeder and its diet can easily be influenced by the availability of fruit. During seasons where ripe fruit is available, the golden monkey tends to feed more on fruit. The golden monkey may also feed on various flowers and shrubs when they are available. The most frequent invertebrate eaten is the pupae of lepidopterous larvae picked from leaves. Bamboo tends to be the most frequently eaten because it is often more available year-round.

Conservation
The golden monkey is listed as endangered on the IUCN Red List. Certain activities may threaten the conservation of the golden monkey. Illegal activities that harm the ecosystem such as tree extraction and bamboo removal are serious threats. Some research indicates that tree removal poses a more serious risk.

References

External links

golden monkey
Mammals of the Democratic Republic of the Congo
Mammals of Rwanda
Mammals of Uganda
golden monkey
Taxobox binomials not recognized by IUCN
Taxa named by Paul Matschie